Janice Gregory (née Powell; born 10 January 1955) is a Welsh Labour politician, who represented the constituency of  Ogmore from the time the National Assembly for Wales was established in 1999 to the election of 2016. Her main contribution to the Assembly has been through chairing the Social Justice and Regeneration Committee.

Family
Gregory was born in Treorchy, the daughter of Raymond Powell, who was Labour Party Member of Parliament for Ogmore from 1979. She was educated at Bridgend Grammar School for Girls and worked as Constituency Secretary to her father from 1991, while also being active in the local Constituency Labour Party in which she was Women's Officer and Chair of the Ogmore Women's Forum. Several other members of the family were also active in Labour politics.

Election to the National Assembly
In 1999 Gregory was selected as Labour candidate for the same constituency as her father for the election to the National Assembly for Wales. She easily held the seat and was appointed as a Labour group whip in the Assembly. Together with three other whips, Gregory resigned this position in February 2000 after Alun Michael resigned as First Minister. It was speculated that the three, being loyal to Michael, were unwilling to continue serving under Andrew Davies who had plotted to get remove him.

Politics in the Assembly
Gregory rebelled against the Labour administration in June 2000 when she voted in favour of a building a landmark headquarters building for the Assembly. She called on former cabinet minister Ron Davies to resign when it was revealed he had applied for jobs outside politics without informing the Labour leadership. When her father suddenly died in December 2001, Gregory immediately declined to seek selection to follow him. The death of Sir Ray Powell raised questions over whether Gregory would be reselected herself, but she managed to survive and was re-elected in the 2003 election with a 6,504 majority.

Social Justice committee
She was then made Chair of the Social Justice and Regeneration Committee. She was described by the Western Mail as a "well below par performer by our reckoning" and given a rating of 4 marks out of ten in its assessment of the Assembly Members at the end of the 2003-07 term. However, she increased her majority in the 2007 election.

References

Offices held

1955 births
Living people
Wales AMs 1999–2003
Wales AMs 2003–2007
Wales AMs 2007–2011
Wales AMs 2011–2016
Welsh Labour members of the Senedd
Female members of the Senedd
People educated at Ysgol Brynteg
20th-century British women politicians